Jean François Gaultier (6 October 1708 in La Croix-Avranchin - 10 July 1756 in Quebec) was a French physician and botanist. He was the king's physician for New France and was the regular physician at the Hôtel-Dieu de Québec. Gaultier, being one of the leading naturalists in Canada, supported Swedish botanist Pehr Kalm in his 1749 exploring voyage of Quebec.

Jean-François Gaultier married to Madeleine-Marie-Anne on 12 March 1752.

References 

18th-century French botanists
People from Manche
1708 births
1756 deaths
18th-century French physicians
People of New France